This is a list of circuits which have hosted a round of the Australian Touring Car Championship and the V8 Supercars Championship since the championship was first held at Gnoo Blas in Orange, New South Wales, in 1960.

The shortest track used in the championship was the  Amaroo Park circuit located in the Sydney suburb of Annangrove. The longest track used was the Longford Circuit which measured . Sandown Raceway in Melbourne has hosted the most rounds with 51.

Of the 34 circuits that have hosted rounds of the championship, twelve have been temporary street or airfield circuits with five still in use as of the 2022 season. Six international circuits have also been used, two in New Zealand and one each in China, Bahrain, the United Arab Emirates and the United States.

Championship circuits

Unless stated, all tracks are located within Australia.

* New circuit in use for the current season.

Non-championship events
This section refers to non-championship events held in the Group 3A era of 1993 onwards.

References

Motorsport venues in Australia
Supercars Championship circuits
Supercars